Hiram Powers Dilworth (18781975) was an American pianist and poet.

Dilworth was born in Hicksville, Ohio and had a career as a music educator beginning at the Cincinnati College of Music and then Nebraska State University. However, he switched careers when he moved to Chicago and became a guard at the Art Institute of Chicago.

During this time, Dilworth worked on his poetry. His manuscripts were largely written on Art Institute bulletins. Many of his poems from this time are sonnets, and the themes of his work vary from the natural to the political, with occasional humorous poems. He also wrote about music, as he was heavily involved in the Chicago music scene, performing and attending classical music concerts.

Dilworth published several poems, such as "The Cup of Joy", "Les Sonnets Celestes", and "Ode to Morning", but desired to remain an independent poet rather than a poet-for-profit. He received the most acclaim for a patriotic poem, "Harry Butters".

External links
 Hiram Powers Dilworth Papers at Newberry Library
 Guide to the Hiram Powers Dillworth Papers 1949-1950 at the University of Chicago Special Collections Research Center

1878 births
1975 deaths
People from Hicksville, Ohio
American music educators
American male poets
Antioch College alumni
Poets from Ohio
Musicians from Ohio
20th-century American poets
20th-century American pianists
20th-century American male writers
American male pianists
Educators from Ohio
20th-century American male musicians